In enzymology, a queuine tRNA-ribosyltransferase is an enzyme that catalyzes the chemical reaction

[tRNA]-guanine + queuine  [tRNA]-queuine + guanine

Thus, the two substrates of this enzyme are tRNA-guanine and queuine, whereas its two products are [tRNA]-queuine and guanine.

This enzyme belongs to the family of glycosyltransferases, specifically the pentosyltransferases. The systematic name of this enzyme class is [tRNA]-guanine:queuine tRNA-D-ribosyltransferase. Other names in common use include tRNA-guanine transglycosylase, guanine insertion enzyme, tRNA transglycosylase, Q-insertase, queuine transfer ribonucleate ribosyltransferase, transfer ribonucleate glycosyltransferase, tRNA guanine transglycosidase, guanine, queuine-tRNA transglycosylase, and tRNA-guanine:queuine tRNA-D-ribosyltransferase.

Structural studies

References

EC 2.4.2
Enzymes of known structure